Miniopterus ambohitrensis, also known as the Montagne d’Ambre long-fingered bat, is a species of bat in the family Miniopteridae found in Madagascar. Its common name is derived from the Montagne d’Ambre range, where it is found.

Distribution and habitat 
Miniopterus ambohitrensis is known from four localities in the northern and central portions of Madagascar, all of which are montane regions. The range of elevation for this species is 800-1600m. The calculated area of its habitat is 15,143 km2 . There is a possibility that the species is partially migratory.

References 

Miniopteridae
Mammals described in 2015
Endemic fauna of Madagascar
Bats of Africa